Broken Silence is the fifth album by Long Beach, California rapper RBX.

Track listing

Sources
[ AllMusic link]

RBX albums
2007 albums
G-funk albums